Robert Folland (born 16 September 1979) is a footballer who played in the English Football League for Oxford United.

References

Welsh footballers
Oxford United F.C. players
English Football League players
1979 births
Living people
Association football forwards